Bijjala II (1130–1167 CE)  was the Mahamandaleshwara of the Kalyani Chalukyas. He was the most famous of the southern Kalachuri kings who ruled initially as a vassal of Chalukya Vikramaditya VI. He ruled as the Mahamandalesvara (chief or governor) over Karhada-4000 and Tardavadi-1000 provinces, designations given to territories within the larger Western Chalukya kingdom.

He revolted against the Western Chalukya Empire, assumed imperial titles in 1157, and ruled along with his successors, the Deccan Plateau for a quarter of a century.

Bijjala's opportunism
After the death of Vikramaditya VI, seeing the weakening empire, Bijjala II declared independence.
The Chikkalagi inscription refers to Bijjala as Mahabhujabalachakravarti, which in Sanskrit
literally means the great great (maha) unopposed ruler (cakravartin) with strong (bala) arms (bhuja). By the time of Chalukya Taila III, Bijjala's attempts towards independence seems to have spread to other feudatories as well. Kakatiya Prola II broke free of Chalukya rule in the middle of the 12th century. By 1162 CE. Bijjala II had managed to drive Taila III out of Kalyani, the Chalukya capital. He assumed Chalukyan titles like Sriprithvivallabha and Parameshvara. He shifted his capital from Mangalavada to Kalyani also known as Basavakalyan.

Bloody end
His rule was marked with turbulence, both domestic and social. According to the historian Dr. P.B. Desai,
Bijjala II became very unpopular with the followers of Basavanna and was assassinated by them. Dr. Desai
however does confirm that Basavanna himself was not responsible for this incident. He was succeeded by his younger son Sovideva to the throne.

References

Bibliography
 Dr. Suryanath U. Kamat (2001). Concise History of Karnataka, MCC, Bangalore (Reprinted 2002)

12th-century Indian monarchs
History of Karnataka